Cecilia Lucila Callejo Correa (October 31, 1907 – August 18, 2003), known as Cecilia Callejo, was an American actress and dancer, born in Puerto Rico. She appeared in films, including It's a Wonderful World (1939), Passport to Alcatraz (1940), and The Cisco Kid Returns (1945).

Early life 
Callejo was born in Manatí, Puerto Rico and raised in New York, one of the twelve children of composer and musicologist Fernando Callejo Ferrer and his wife Trinidad, a pianist. She studied dance with La Argentina. Musicians Olga Samaroff and Leopold Stokowski helped her make connections in Hollywood.

Career 
Callejo appeared in films in the 1930s and 1940s, including Outlaw Express (1938), The Renegade Ranger (1938), Dramatic School (1938), Verbena Tragica (Block Party, 1939), It's a Wonderful World (1939), Passport to Alcatraz (1940), The Falcon in Mexico (1944), Marriage is a Private Affair (1944), and The Cisco Kid Returns (1945). In 1948, she coached Jennifer Jones on her Cuban accent for We Were Strangers (1949).  

On stage, Callejo danced on a program with Ruth St. Denis and others in 1933, and at a benefit show in Los Angeles in 1937. She appeared in a 1939 Los Angeles production of Desert Song. She had one Broadway credit, in the original cast of the mystery melodrama The Cat Screams (1942).

Personal life 
Callejo married screenwriter Robert Presnell Sr. in 1939, as his third wife; he died in 1969. She died in Tujunga, California in 2003, aged 95 years.

References

External links 

 
 

1907 births
2003 deaths
People from Manatí, Puerto Rico
20th-century Puerto Rican actresses
Puerto Rican dancers